Alianza Fútbol Club, also known simply as Alianza, is a professional football club based in San Salvador, El Salvador. Founded in 1958, Alianza was almost immediately successful, winning its first championships in the 1966 and 1967 Salvadoran seasons. Even more significantly, Alianza was the first Central American and Salvadoran club to win the CONCACAF Champions' Cup in 1967, and is currently one of only three Salvadoran teams to have done so.

History

The beginning
Atlético La Constancia was formed in 1958 by a group of workers in San Salvador.  Although small in terms of financial status, they were able to reach the Liga de Ascenso (second division) final in 1958. They lost 2–0 in a two legged series against Águila. The club, however, purchased a spot in the first division at the expense of Once Municipal. This enabled them to gain the sponsorship of the Intercontinental Hotel and its president, Peruvian Axel Hochkoeppler.

Because of Hochkoeppler's support, Alianza FC president Enrique Sol Meza decided to name the club Alianza FC in honor of Alianza Lima. Hernán Vivanco joined the club as the coach and began getting the players to play an exciting style of football. That style and a strong advertising campaign quickly won over the support of the population of San Salvador. Before long, Alianza was surpassing Juventud Olímpica as the nation's most popular club.

One of Alianza's greatest triumphs happened in 1966, when they defeated a Santos side that included the great Pelé.  The win took place at the Estadio Nacional Flor Blanc, and featured the efforts of loaned Argentines Dante Juárez, Juan Verón and Santiago, all on loan at the time.

Orquesta Blanca
1966 was also the year that Alianza won its first tile.  Due to the cohesion and speed with which Hernán Carrasco had the team playing, Alianza became known as La Orquesta Alba (the Dawn Orchestra).  The team was made up of many great players, including Edgar "Pata Gorda" Morales, Roberto "La Burra" Rivas, Alberto "Pechuga" Villalta, Raúl "Araña" Magaña, Guido Alvarado, Salvador Mariona, Mario Monge, Luis "Cascarita" Tapia, Miguel "El Chueco" Hermosilla, Ricardo Sepúlveda and Jorge "El Conejo" Liévano.

The team won fifteen straight matches on their way to the league championship, where they defeated Águila 2–1.  Goals were scored by Hermosilla and Mario Monge.  In all, "La Orquesta Alba" outscored their opponents eighty-three to thirty-nine and won twenty of their thirty-six matches.

The club repeated as champions in 1967, defeating Sonsonate FC 5–1 in the finals.  They then went on to become the first El Salvadoran club to win the CONCACAF Champions' Cup, defeating Jong Colombia over a three-leg series. Alianza lost the first leg, but won the second to force a replay.  They prevailed 5–3, with Tapia and Flores scoring twice each.

Decline and title drought
After the 1967 title, members of the Orquestra began retiring.  Players like Brazilian internationals Camargo, Taneses and Nilton Rodarte, Peruvian international Fernando Alva, Uruguayan international Julio César "El Pocho" Cortés, Chilean international Hugo Ottensen came through the ranks.  So too did domestic players including Miguel "La Mica" González, Herbert Machón, "Míchel" Cornejo, Armando Cortez Sandoval, Jaime "Samba" Saravia, Roberto "El Cuchillo" Guerra, Jaime "La Chelona" Rodríguez and Carlos "El Cacho" Meléndez.  However, the 1970s were less successful than the 1960s.

They reached the playoff finals four times (1971, 1973, 1975–76, and 1978–79) but finished runner-up each time.  Then, after a string of disappointing seasons, the club came out of the wilderness to challenge for the title in 1985.  However, they would be runners-up again, losing 5–2 to city rivals Atlético Marte.

Title success
In 1986, the title drought finally ended. Ricardo Sepúlveda, a member of "The Orquesta Alba", returned to the club as a manager and led them to their third championship and first in twenty years. The championship match pitted Alianza against Águila, and it ended 0–0 after extra time.  The game went to penalties, and Alianza won 3–1, with Carlos Reyes scoring the decisive goal.  A corner had been turned.

The brilliance of Chilean Raúl Toro powered Alianza to a fourth title in 1989; he scored the winning goal in the final against Luis Ángel Firpo.  1993–94 saw a fifth crown, as the Uruguayan Gustavo Faral managed the club to a 2–1 championship win over FAS.

1997 saw Alianza win its second international championship, when they defeated Deportivo Saprissa from Costa Rica to win the UNCAF Club Championship. The management of technician Juan Carlos Masnik and the heroic efforts of players such as Horacio Lugo, Marcelo Bauza, Uruguayan Alejandro Curbelo and Adrián de la Cruz powered the team to two more titles soon after.

The Invincibles
Alianza went through the Apertura 2017 season undefeated, becoming the first Salvadoran side to achieve such a feat.  Their 4–1 win over Santa Tecla in the final was the icing on the cake, and saw a double from Rodolfo Zelaya, plus strikes from league leading goalscorer Gustavo Guerreño, and midfielder Marvin Monterrosa.

Honours

Domestic honours
Primera División: 17
Winners (17): 1965–66, 1966–67, 1986–87, 1989–90, 1993–94, 1996–97, Apertura 1998, Apertura 2001, Clausura 2004, Clausura 2011, Apertura 2015, Apertura 2017, Clausura 2018, Apertura 2019, Apertura 2020, Apertura 2021, Clausura 2022
Copa Presidente: 1
Winners (1): 1966

International honours
CONCACAF Champions' Cup: 1
Winners (1): 1967
UNCAF Club Championship: 1
Winners (1): 1997
Runner-up (1): 1980

Friendly tournament
Copa Acción Cívica: 1
1966

Copa Santa Ana: 1
1977

Copa Roberto "Burra" Rivas: 1
 2015

Records

TBD holds the record for most Alianza appearances, having played TBD first-team matches from Year to Year. TBD comes second with 725 appearances. The record for a goalkeeper is held by TBD, with 000 appearances. With 000 caps (000 while at the club), TBD is Alianza's most capped international player.

Rodolfo Zelaya is Alianza's all-time top goalscorer, with 147 goals. Six other players have also scored over 100 goals for Alianza: TBD (1953–64), TBD (1971–88), TBD (1958–66), TBD (1985–92), TBD (2009–current) and the previous goalscoring record-holder TBD (1994–2010). TBD holds the record for the most league goals scored in one season (48 in 2014–15). TBD's 49 goals in 58 matches was for decades the all-time highest tally in CONCACAF competition. The fastest goal in the history of the club (26 seconds) was scored by the Colombian Duvier Riascos on 15 September 2021 during a league match against Santa Tecla F.C.

 Alianza FC was the first Salvadoran team to win CONCACAF Champions' Cup.
 Alianza FC are the last Salvadoran team to win UNCAF Club Championship.
 Alianza FC are the last Salvadoran team to win an international competition, this being the UNCAF Club Championship in 1997.
 Alianza FC are the first and only team in Salvadoran League to win the domestic championship undefeated.

Sponsorship
Companies that Alianza currently has sponsorship deals with include:
 Umbro – official kit suppliers
 Tigo – official sponsors
 Pepsi – official sponsors
 Domino's Pizza – official sponsors
 Los Rinconcitos – official sponsors
 Farmactas virgen de Guadulope – official sponsors
 Gatorade – official sponsors
 Canal 4 – official sponsors

Stadium
Alianza Futbol Club has forged its entire history in the Estadio Nacional de la Flor Blanca (now Estadio Jorge "Mágico" González), in which they achieved three titles during the 1960s. However, it was damaged in the 2001 earthquakes and Alianza moved to the Estadio Cuscatlán, where they have kept playing to this day.

 Estadio Nacional de la Flor Blanca (1960–2001)
 Estadio Cuscatlán (2002–2012)
 Estadio Nacional de la Flor Blanca (2013)
 Estadio Cuscatlán (2013–2014)
 Estadio Nacional de la Flor Blanca (2014)
 Estadio Cuscatlán (2015–present)

Players
Alianza is the first Salvadoran team to form an under-17 team for the new Under-17 League competition that was scheduled to begin in April 2014.

Current squad
As of: 5 February, 2023

Out on loan

In

Out

Players with dual citizenship
   Michel Mercado
   Alexander Larín
   Henry Romero

Youth League squad
Alianza "B". 's youth squad plays in the ten-team Primera División Reserves (El Salvador). Current members of the squad are:

Coaching staff

Management

Notable players

Notable players
Below are the notable former and current players who have represented Alianza in Primera Division and international competition since the club's foundation in 1958. To appear in the section below, a player must have played in at least 100 official matches for the club, a list of every Alianza player who has been called up by their national team.

 Joaquin Canales

 Misael Alfaro
 Ramiro Carballo
 Raúl Magaña
 Salvador Mariona
 José Quintanilla
 Roberto Rivas
 Jaime Rodríguez
 Adonay Martínez
 Rodolfo Zelaya
 Horacio Lugo
 Luis Hernán Álvarez
 Ricardo Sepúlveda
 Adolfo Alamiro Olivares
 Didier Ovono
 Luis Ernesto Tapia
 Julio César Cortés
 Alejandro Curbelo

Team captains

Retired numbers
2 –  Roberto Rivas, defender (1960–70)

Presidential history
Alianza have had numerous presidents over the course of their history, some of which have been the owners of the club; others have been honorary presidents. Here is a complete list of them.

Notable managers

The most successful all-time manager is Chilean Hernán Carrasco, who won four championships during his two tenures with Alianza FC (1966–67, 1989–92). The list of honours includes three Primera División titles (1965–66, 1966–67, 1989–90) and one CONCACAF Champions' Cup (1967).

Uruguayan Carlos Masnik was another notable manager with two titles won with Alianza, one Primera División championships (1996–97) and one UNCAF Club Championship (1997).

Chilean Ricardo Sepúlveda and Uruguayan Rubén Alonso both had outstanding careers as players for Alianza, and are the only two to win a title both as a player and coach. Sepulveda won the 1986–87, while Alonso won the Apertura 1998 and Apertura 2015, their most recent title victory.

Gustavo Faral won the 1993–94 championship, becoming the first Uruguayan and the first of three Uruguayans to win a title with Alianza.

Ramón Paredes become the first and so far only Salvadoran coach to win a title as coach of Alianza, which he did in the 2001 Apertura title.

Uruguayan Juan Martín Mujica led the team to the 2004 Clausura title.

Under the coaching of Roberto Gamarra, Alianza won the Clausura 2011.

Jorge Humberto Rodriguez helped Alianza win the 2017 Apertura title and also achieve the distinction of being the first team to go the entire season undefeated.

References

External links

 
Official Twitter

 
1958 establishments in El Salvador
Association football clubs established in 1958
Alianza
Football clubs in San Salvador
CONCACAF Champions League winning clubs
UNCAF Interclub Cup winning clubs